Mohr Rural District is a rural district (dehestan) in the Central District of Mohr County, Fars Province, Iran. At the 2006 census, its population was 2,705, in 545 families.  The rural district has 10 villages.

References 

Rural Districts of Fars Province
Mohr County